Krisztina Szabó is a Hungarian-Canadian mezzo-soprano opera singer who has performed in a number of operatic roles. A graduate of the University of Western Ontario, Szabó finished her postgraduate studies at the Guildhall School of Music and Drama in London. She was awarded the Emerging Artist grant from the Canada Council. Ms. Szabó was a 1997 winner of the Mozart Competition, held under the auspices of the Canadian Opera Company, and in 1998 she joined the Canadian Opera's Ensemble Studio. It was with the Canadian Opera Ensemble Studio that she sang the title role in Benjamin Britten's The Rape of Lucretia, with which she made her European debut in Amsterdam.

External links

Biography

Year of birth missing (living people)
Living people
Canadian mezzo-sopranos
21st-century Canadian women opera singers
Canadian people of Hungarian descent
Operatic mezzo-sopranos